Pauline Marie Jaricot (22 July 1799 – 9 January 1862), the founder of the Society of the Propagation of the Faith and of the Association of the Living Rosary, was a French member of the Third Order of Saint Dominic.

Pope John XXIII ratified the first step of her beatification process, declaring her venerable. On 26 May 2020, Pope Francis recognized a miracle attributed to her intercession as the final requirement for beatification.

Life
Jaricot was born on 22 July 1799, the youngest of seven children of Antoine and Jeanne Jaricot in Lyon, France. Her father owned a silk factory in Lyon, France. Her brother, Philéas, was a missionary in Quangnam. At fifteen years of age she was introduced into the social life of the city. Subsequently, a sermon on vanity made a deep impression on her.

At the age of seventeen, after a serious fall and the death of her mother, Jaricot began to lead a life of intense prayer, and on Christmas Day, 1816, took a vow of perpetual virginity. She established a union of prayer among pious servant girls, the members of which were known as the "Réparatrices du Sacré-Coeur de Jésus-Christ".

As a member of an association founded by the Fathers of the Foreign Missions of Paris, Jaricot was a pioneer of organized missionary co-operation. With the women employees in the silk factory run by her sister and brother-in-law, she resolved to help the missions with prayers and a small weekly contribution of one penny a week from each person involved. The seed grew and other groups joined to help all missions. This eventually led to the founding of the Society for the Propagation of the Faith in 1822, dedicated to helping missionary efforts worldwide. On May 3, 1922 Pope Pius XI declared the Society for the Propagation of the Faith "Pontifical".

Another member of the Third Order of St. Dominic, Jaricot's spiritual director for many years, was John Vianney. In 1822, Jaricot arranged the printing and distribution of religious literature; she believed that information about the missions should be publicized. Later, the future Society would publish the Annals which contained reports from various mission territories aimed at increasing interest in the Society and the missions. 

Jaricot became very ill and on 10 August 1835 she was healed by, she believed, Saint Philomena during a pilgrimage to Mungnano, Italy.

Around 1845 Jaricot purchased a blast furnace plant to be run as a model of Christian social reform. A building adjacent to the plant accommodated the families, and close by was a school and a chapel. She left the management to people who proved to be dishonest, and she was forced to declare bankruptcy in 1862. Having exhausted all her money, she spent the rest of her life destitute. She died on January 9, 1862, in Lyon.

Veneration
Since 1935 the mortal remains of Jaricot lie in the Church of Saint-Nizier in Lyon. In a homily on 9 January 2013, at the end of the celebrations commemorating on the 150th anniversary of her death, Cardinal Fernando Filoni, prefect of the Congregation for the Evangelization of Peoples, said that "Jaricot’s heroic virtues do not consist in a series of miraculous events, but in that fruitful fidelity to Christ, to whom she devoted herself both in good times and in … difficult … moments"

On 26 May 2020, Pope Francis authorised the Congregation for the Causes of Saints to promulgate a decree recognizing a miracle attributed to Jaricot's intercession. Her beatification was celebrated on 22 May 2022 in Lyon, with Cardinal Luis Antonio Tagle presiding on the Pope's behalf.

The Association of the Living Rosary 
In 1826 Jaricot founded the Association of the Living Rosary. The fifteen decades of the rosary were divided among fifteen associates, each of whom had to recite daily only one determined decade. She expanded the organization's work to include the distribution of prayer leaflets, holy pictures, medals and rosaries. The Association of the Living Rosary grew rapidly in France and spread to other countries during her lifetime and for years thereafter. In 1832, Pope Gregory XVI gave it canonical status.

By the mid-20th century, however, the number of members had markedly decreased, especially in the United States. The organization was revived through the efforts of Patti and Richard Melvin of Dickinson, Texas, and 28 other devotees who renewed the practice of organizing 15 persons to each pray one of the 15 Decades of the rosary.

By the year 2014, the membership numbers of the Association of the Living Rosary nearly 16 million persons of all ages, with substantial numbers in Third World countries. The organization maintains an internet website at philomena.org, authored by Patti Dickinson, who is universal director of the Living Rosary. A Facebook page, Universal Living Rosary Association, is authored by apostolate promoter Brian J. Costello of New Roads, Louisiana.

References

External links
"Pauline Jaricot", Association Les Amis de Pauline Jaricot

Catholic missions
1799 births
1862 deaths
Venerated Catholics
Beatifications by Pope Francis